Roger Achten (20 December 1927 – 10 April 2004) was a Belgian fencer. He competed in the individual and team épée events at the 1956 and 1960 Summer Olympics.

References

External links
 

1927 births
2004 deaths
Belgian male fencers
Belgian épée fencers
Olympic fencers of Belgium
Fencers at the 1956 Summer Olympics
Fencers at the 1960 Summer Olympics
People from Herzele
Sportspeople from East Flanders